"Don't Play That" is a song by  American rapper King Von and Atlanta-based rapper 21 Savage. Written alongside producer Kid Hazel, it was released on February 4, 2022 through Only the Family and Empire Distribution as the second single from Von's second studio album, What It Means to Be King.

Background 
King Von teased the song on October 7, 2020. The first version contained a guest participation by Key Glock. On April 30, 2021, a demo version of "Don't Play That" leaked online.

It is the first posthumous single from King Von and the first collaboration with 21 Savage.

Critical reception 
Uproxxs Wongo Okon said that "The track serves as another example of Von's straight-to-the-point raps which left little to no room for any fun or games". He also praised 21 Savage's part. Erika Marie of HotNewHipHop wrote that "fans have anticipated [song] since prior to [Von's] murder".

Charts

Certifications

References 

2022 singles
2022 songs
King Von songs
21 Savage songs
Songs written by 21 Savage
Empire Distribution singles
Songs released posthumously